Brisbane City Football Club is an Australian semi-professional football club based in Newmarket, Brisbane, Queensland. Founded in 1952, the club competed in the National Soccer League until the 1986 season where they were relegated back to State League Competition. Brisbane City competed in the National Premier Leagues Queensland from 2013, until they were relegated to the lower tier Football Queensland Premier League with one match remaining in the 2020 season. Home matches are played at Spencer Park.

National Soccer League
In 1977 City became a foundation member of the National Soccer League. City's first match was a 0–1 defeat to Marconi at Perry Park on 3 April 1977 in front of a crowd of 5,214.

Despite struggling in the first two seasons, including finishing bottom, they won the NSL Cup in those two years. In 1977 City defeated Marconi 5–3 on penalties after a 1–1 draw, and the following year they overcame Adelaide City 2–1. Both matches were played in Brisbane. City's third NSL season saw a much improved 4th-place finish which saw them qualify for the Top Four round robin series where they reached the Grand Final, losing to Sydney City 2–1 on aggregate.

1980 saw a reversal in fortunes with only four league wins recorded, but 1981 saw a battle for the NSL title, eventually finishing third, 8 points behind Champions Sydney City, with striker Paul Wilkinson weighing in with 12 goals. In those days the NSL compelled clubs to change any ethnic titles in their name, and as such City were occasionally referred to as Brisbane Gladiators around this time.

The following two seasons were a struggle, bottom of the table in 1982 was followed by third bottom in 1983, with city rivals Brisbane Lions bottom. It was tough times for NSL football in the city. For the following three seasons the NSL was increased in size but divided into two Conferences, with City finding themselves in the Southern Division alongside the Melbourne and Adelaide clubs. Fortunes didn't improve however and in 1987 with a return to a single division NSL and a reduction in clubs, City were relegated along with Brisbane Lions to the Queensland State League where they remain today bringing to an end ten successive seasons at national level.

The last NSL match at Spencer Park took place on 8 September 1986, a 0–0 draw with Sunshine George Cross in front of only 838 fans

NSL Statistics by Season

(Pld)=Games Played, (W)=Wins, (D)=Draws, (L)=Losses, (GF)=Goals For, (GA)=Goals Against, (Pts)=Points, (Sth)=Southern Conference

Players

First-team squad

Notable former players
List of former players who played professionally or have represented their nation at senior level.
Australia
 Mark Brusasco
 Steve Perry
 Isaka Cernak
 Kenny Dougall
 John Coyne
 Griffin McMaster
 Adam Sarota
 Michael Zullo
England
 Antonio Murray
Northern Ireland
 Bobby Campbell
Scotland
 Jim Hermiston
 John McVeigh
 Billy Wilkinson
South Sudan
  Denis Yongule
Papua New Guinea
 Alex Davani
 Nathaniel Lepani
Malaysia
 Curran Singh Ferns

See also

 National Premier Leagues Queensland
List of soccer clubs in Australia
List of sports clubs inspired by others

References

External links
Official Website
Summer Super 6 Site

 
Association football clubs established in 1952
National Soccer League (Australia) teams
National Premier Leagues clubs
Soccer clubs in Brisbane
1952 establishments in Australia
Italian-Australian backed sports clubs of Queensland